Ivica Olić (born 14 September 1979) is a Croatian professional football manager and former player who is an assistant coach of the Croatia national team.

During his career, he played for German Bundesliga clubs such as Hamburger SV, VfL Wolfsburg and Bayern Munich, as well as CSKA Moscow, winning the 2004–05 UEFA Cup for the latter, and also for the Croatia national team. Olić primarily played as a striker but could also operate as a winger. He has been described as a relentless pursuer of the ball and possessing "power and a decent bit of pace with him". Former Croatia manager Slaven Bilić described him as a typical "match-winner" and "king of important matches" due to his ability to score in important matches against big opponents. Named the Croatian Footballer of the Year in 2009 and 2010, Olić appeared with Bayern Munich in two UEFA Champions League finals, in 2010 and 2012.

Olić represented Croatia at three FIFA World Cups–in 2002, 2006 and 2014–and two UEFA European Championships–in 2004 and 2008; earning his 100th cap on 16 November 2014, before retiring from international football in 2015.

He started his coaching career in 2017, joining the coaching staff upon appointment of Zlatko Dalić as Croatia national team head coach. He helped the team reach the 2018 FIFA World Cup Final and qualify for UEFA Euro 2020, interrupting his tenure with the team to briefly coach his former club CSKA Moscow.

Club career

Early career
Olić was born and raised in the village of Davor near Slavonski Brod, Croatia. He started playing football for the local club NK Marsonia in 1996, and spent two good seasons there, before he was acquired by German club Hertha BSC in 1998. He did not see much play there and returned to Marsonia the following year, where he earned promotion to the top flight after winning the Croatian Second League with his team.

After another successful season at Marsonia, in the 2000–01 season, he scored 17 goals in 29 games – in 2001, he moved to NK Zagreb, where he scored 21 goals in 28 appearances and helped his team win the league. The following season, he moved to Dinamo Zagreb, where he scored 16 goals in 27 games, and became the best striker in the Croatian First League.

CSKA Moscow
In 2003, Olić was acquired by CSKA Moscow. His form rose gradually, and in the 2005 season, he contributed with ten goals in twice as many games. With CSKA Moscow, he won the UEFA Cup in 2005, the Russian Premier League three times (in 2003, 2005 and 2006), the Russian Cup twice (in 2005 and 2006), and twice the Russian Super Cup (2004 and 2006).

After winning the UEFA Cup, Olić was awarded with the Order of Friendship by the Russian Federation.

Hamburger SV

In January 2007, Olić moved to Hamburger SV, playing his first Bundesliga match with them against Energie Cottbus on 31 January. He was signed because Hamburg were in deep trouble, finishing in the relegation zone before the winter break. It worked out in the end, and Hamburg finished seventh, which even acquired them a UEFA Intertoto Cup place, which they eventually won. He scored two goals in the last match in the 2006–07 Bundesliga season against Alemannia Aachen in a 4–0 win. In October 2007, Olić scored a hat-trick in the Bundesliga match against VfB Stuttgart, which Hamburg won 4–1. He was the first player in the club's history to score three successive goals in one half.

Olić effectively won the 2008 Emirates Cup for Hamburg, with two injury time goals against Juventus, increasing the team's points tally to an unassailable level (due to the points-for-goals system). He endeared himself to Hamburg fans for his commitment and consistent work rate on the pitch. In his last game for the north German club, he sported a T-shirt with the words, "Danke fans" ("Thank you, fans") written on it, as he bid farewell to the fans.

Bayern Munich

On 3 January 2009, Olić signed a three-year contract with Bundesliga rivals Bayern Munich. He joined the club on a free transfer on 1 July 2009. Initially, he was supposed to be back-up to the likes of Miroslav Klose and Mario Gómez, but due to injury and fitness issues, he began to be preferred as the club's first choice. On 8 August, his Bayern debut, he scored the opening goal against 1899 Hoffenheim in a 1–1 draw and soon became a favourite with the Bayern fans. He reached new heights upon scoring a crucial goal in the 2010 Champions League quarter-final (first leg) against Manchester United in injury time, to give Bayern a slender 2–1 lead. He also scored the first goal in the second leg for his team, but they trailed 3–1. The game ended 3–2. Bayern, however, won on away goals. He scored his first hat-trick for the Bavarians against Lyon, scoring with his left foot, right foot, and his head, in the Champions League semi-final second leg on 27 April 2010. The victory against Lyon secured his team a place in the final against Internazionale, which they eventually lost 2–0. On 3 April 2012, he scored a brace in a 2–0 win against Marseille in the 2011–12 UEFA Champions League quarter-finals. Olić played his final game for Bayern in the 2012 UEFA Champions League Final against Chelsea, in which he came on as a 97th-minute substitute for the injured Franck Ribéry. Bayern eventually lost the game in a penalty shootout when the game ended 1–1 after extra time. Olić missed the team's fourth penalty, as they lost the shootout 4–3.

VfL Wolfsburg

Olić signed for VfL Wolfsburg at the start of the 2012–13 season. He scored his first Bundesliga goal for Wolfsburg against Greuther Fürth, and he netted another one against Fortuna Düsseldorf. He started the season with a hat-trick against Schönberg 95 in the 2012–13 DFB-Pokal. He scored another goal in the quarter-final match of the DFB-Pokal against Kickers Offenbach on 26 February 2013, as Wolfsburg secured a spot in the semi-finals. He produced an "acrobatic overhead kick" to score the first of his two goals in a 5–2 win against SC Freiburg in March 2013. He finished the season as first-choice striker for the club, with 15 goals and 6 assists. On 24 April 2014, Olić signed a new two-year deal with the German side. In the opening match of the 2014–15 Bundesliga season, he scored a spectacular goal against his former club Bayern Munich.

Return to Hamburger SV
Olić returned to Hamburger SV on 30 January 2015 after signing an 18-month contract for an undisclosed fee. He was given kit number 8, but at the end of the 2014–15 season, Ivo Iličević changed his kit number from 11 to 7, prompting Olić to reclaim number 11, which he had worn previously at both Bayern and Wolfsburg, and also in his first spell at Hamburg.

1860 Munich
On 26 July 2016, Olić signed a one-year deal with 2. Bundesliga side 1860 Munich.
On 25 June 2017, Olić announced his retirement. Later, he revoked that comment saying "I know Bild published I am retiring, but that is not true. [...] Maybe I have played my last game and maybe not. It is the same as last summer – if I receive an offer that is good for me, I will continue."

International career
Olić was part of the Croatia national team at the 2002 FIFA World Cup, where he played in two games and scored one important goal against Italy in a 2–1 Croatia victory. Shortly after scoring, Olić revealed a picture of his newly born child at the time under his jersey. He was remembered as being unable to put his jersey back on, as the material became tangled in the excitement during his celebration. Olić also played three games for Croatia at UEFA Euro 2004 and two games at the 2006 World Cup.

In September 2006, Olić was dropped from the Croatian squad for a Euro 2008 qualifying match for one game, due to a late-night partying binge together with Darijo Srna and Boško Balaban. He was named man of the match in the very last qualifier of their group, in which Croatia defeated England 3–2 at Wembley Stadium. He was named in Croatia's 23-man squad for the final tournament, and scored in their second Group B match against Germany to give the Croats a 2–1 shock win over the pre-tournament favourites.

Olić was recalled to the side for the 2010 World Cup qualifiers. He contributed with three goals in eight games, but Croatia missed out on a play-off spot by a point. Olić was injured in a friendly match against Norway, which was the cause of his last-moment absence in Euro 2012. On 22 March 2013, Olić scored his first goal since November 2011 and assisted Mario Mandžukić in a qualifier for the 2014 World Cup against Serbia. In the opening game of the finals, on 12 June, his left-wing cross led to the first goal of the tournament, deflected into his own net by Marcelo of Brazil. In the second group game against Cameroon on 18 June, Olić opened the scoring in the 11th minute for an eventual 4–0 win. It was his first goal after 12 years in the World Cup, a difference only previously matched by Denmark's Michael Laudrup, and with this goal he became his country's oldest World Cup goal-scorer.

On 16 November 2014, in a Euro 2016 qualifying match against Italy at the San Siro, Olić earned his 100th cap in a 1–1 draw. On 2 March 2016, Olić retired from international football in an open letter to the public. His final international was an October 2015 European Championship qualification match away against Malta. He scored 20 goals in 104 caps for his country.

Managerial career
On 23 October 2017, Olić was presented as an assistant coach of newly appointed Croatia head coach Zlatko Dalić ahead of a World Cup qualifier against Greece.

In late March 2021, Sport-Express and Sportske novosti published a story about Olić succeeding Viktor Goncharenko at his former club CSKA Moscow. The rumours were confirmed by Croatia head coach Dalić to Sportske novosti. His assistant coaches were rumoured to be Miloš Krasić and Elvir Rahimić. The appointment was made official on 23 March 2021. The move was met with skepticism due to Olić's inexperience in the head coach job. Despite earlier rumours, Krasić and Rahimić were not hired as assistant coaches, instead Ilija Aračić was hired as an assistant coach, with previously hired Aleksei Berezutski and Dmitry Kramarenko rounding up the coaching staff. He made his debut on 4 April, in the 2–1 league victory over Tambov. After two more victories, Olić suffered his first defeat in his fourth match, 2–1 loss to Sochi on 18 April. On 25 April, he suffered his third defeat in a row after losing 1–0 to Spartak Moscow in his first Main Moscow derby, with CSKA's Ilzat Akhmetov getting sent off in the 37th minute. After losing 3–2 to Dynamo Moscow on 16 May, Olić finished the season in sixth place, with CSKA missing out on European competitions for the first time in 20 years. He was unexpectedly sacked on 15 June and succeeded by Berezutski, returning to Zlatko Dalić's team for the UEFA Euro 2020.

Personal life
Olić and his Croatian-German wife Natalie have two sons and a daughter, named Luka, Antonio and Lara, respectively. Unlike many of his counterparts, he prefers to keep a low media profile and generally lives a quiet private life.

Career statistics

Club

International

Scores and results list Croatia's goal tally first.

Managerial statistics

Honours

Player
Hertha BSC II
NOFV-Oberliga: 1998–99

Marsonia
Croatian Second League: 1999–2000

NK Zagreb
Croatian First League: 2001–02

Dinamo Zagreb
Croatian First League: 2002–03
Croatian Super Cup: 2003

CSKA Moscow
Russian Premier League: 2003, 2005, 2006
Russian Cup: 2004–05, 2005–06
Russian Super Cup: 2004, 2006
UEFA Cup: 2004–05

Hamburger SV
UEFA Intertoto Cup: 2007

Bayern Munich
Bundesliga: 2009–10
DFB-Pokal: 2009–10
DFL-Supercup: 2010
UEFA Champions League runner-up: 2009–10, 2011–12

Individual
Croatian Football Hope of the Year: 2001
SN Yellow Shirt Award: 2002, 2003
Prva HNL Player of the Year: 2002
Croatian First League top scorer: 2002, 2003
Bundesliga Player of the Month: October 2007
ARD Goal of the Month: November 2008, March 2013
DFB Pokal Top scorer: 2008–09
Croatian Footballer of the Year: 2009, 2010

Assistant manager
Croatia
FIFA World Cup runner-up: 2018; third place: 2022

Orders
Order of Friendship by Russia: 2005
Order of Danica Hrvatska with face of Franjo Bučar: 2018
Order of the Croatian Trefoil: 2018
Order of the Croatian Interlace: 2018

See also
 List of footballers with 100 or more caps

References

External links

Profile on Soccerphile.com

1979 births
Living people
People from Davor, Croatia
Association football forwards
Croatian footballers
Croatian expatriate footballers
Croatia youth international footballers
Croatia under-21 international footballers
Croatia international footballers
Croatian expatriate sportspeople in Germany
Croatian expatriate sportspeople in Russia
NK Marsonia players
Hertha BSC players
NK Zagreb players
GNK Dinamo Zagreb players
PFC CSKA Moscow players
UEFA Cup winning players
Hamburger SV players
FC Bayern Munich footballers
VfL Wolfsburg players
TSV 1860 Munich players
Croatian Football League players
First Football League (Croatia) players
Second Football League (Croatia) players
Russian Premier League players
Bundesliga players
2. Bundesliga players
Expatriate footballers in Germany
Expatriate footballers in Russia
2002 FIFA World Cup players
2006 FIFA World Cup players
2014 FIFA World Cup players
UEFA Euro 2004 players
UEFA Euro 2008 players
FIFA Century Club
Croatian football managers
PFC CSKA Moscow managers
Russian Premier League managers
Croatian expatriate football managers
Expatriate football managers in Russia